is a JR West Geibi Line station located in Yada, Tessei-chō, Niimi, Okayama Prefecture, Japan.

History
The name of the station is a combination of two characters from the names of two small towns which merged: the 矢 from Yada (矢田) and the 神 from Kamikōjiro (上神代).
1930-02-10: Yagami Station opens when the Sanshin Line between Bitchū Kōjiro Station and Yagami is opened.
1930-11-25: Service to Tōjō Station begins. 
2006-03-18: Express train service begins (one morning train only, all other express trains bypass Yagami Station)

Station layout
Yagami Station is a ground-level station having two platforms.

Highway access
Route 182

Connecting lines
All lines are JR West lines.
Geibi Line
Express: Niimi Station — Yagami Station — Tōjō Station
Local: Ichioka Station — Yagami Station — Nochi Station

External links
 JR West

Geibi Line
Railway stations in Okayama Prefecture
Railway stations in Japan opened in 1930